In category theory, a branch of mathematics, the diagonal functor  is given by , which maps objects as well as morphisms. The arrow comprises the projection maps.

More generally, given a  small index category , one may construct the functor category , the objects of which are called diagrams. Thus, for example, in the case that  is a discrete category with two objects, the diagonal functor  is recovered.

Diagonal functors provide a way to define limits and colimits of diagrams.

The limit functor is the right-adjoint of the diagonal functor. Similarly, the colimit functor (which exists if the category is cocomplete) is the left-adjoint of the diagonal functor.  

For example, the diagonal functor  described above is the left-adjoint of the binary product functor and the right-adjoint of the binary coproduct functor. Other well-known examples include the pushout, which is the limit of the span, and the terminal object, which is the limit of the empty category.

See also
 Diagram (category theory)
 Cone (category theory)
 Diagonal morphism

References

 

  

Category theory